Sultantimirovo (Hultantimer) is a rural locality (a village) in Yamansazsky Selsoviet, Zilairsky District, Bashkortostan, Russia. The population was 250 as of 2010. There are 4 streets.

Geography 
Sultantimirovo is located 60 km east of Zilair (the district's administrative centre) by road. Yamansaz is the nearest rural locality.

References 

Rural localities in Zilairsky District